INCA Súper Flat  are a Salvadoran professional football club based in Entre Rios, La Libertad, El Salvador.

The club changed their name to Club Deportivo INCA.

History
They have played in the Salvadoran Second Division under the name Inca Super Flat until the 2006/2007 season.
Following their time in the second division, the club reverted their name back to Club Deportivo Inca.

Former coaches
   Alcides Salazar (1993–2003)

References

Football clubs in El Salvador